Zinc finger protein 182 is a protein that in humans is encoded by the ZNF182 gene.

Model organisms 

Model organisms have been used in the study of ZNF182 function. A conditional knockout mouse line called Zfp182tm1b(KOMP)Wtsi was generated at the Wellcome Trust Sanger Institute. Male and female animals underwent a standardized phenotypic screen to determine the effects of deletion. Additional screens performed:  - In-depth immunological phenotyping - in-depth bone and cartilage phenotyping

References

Further reading